Die Grundlagen der Einsteinschen Relativitäts-Theorie (English: The Fundamentals of the Einsteinian Relativity Theory) is a 1922 German partly animated documentary film created with the goal of bringing Einstein's theory of relativity to the broad public. It premiered on 2 April 1922 at the Frankfurt Fair.

With more than 80,000 individual images, it is not only the first great science film, it is also the film with the longest trick sequences.

The original version of the film is lost. As part of the research carried out by the 3sat station, an English copy of the film was filmed in 2005 with the British Film Institute, which was provided with English and English language interludes and "speech bubbles". A companion to the English version is also available.

Part of the film was used to create Max Fleischer's The Einstein Theory of Relativity.

References
 Hubert Goenner, Einstein in Berlin. 1914–1933. Beck, 2005, p. 160ff.

1922 films
1922 animated films
1922 documentary films
German animated films
German documentary films
Films of the Weimar Republic
1920s German-language films
Lost German films
Theory of relativity
German silent feature films
Lost animated films
German black-and-white films
1922 lost films
1920s educational films
1920s German films